The 2021 CS Cup of Austria by Icechallenge was held on November 11–14, 2021 in Graz, Austria. It was part of the 2021–22 ISU Challenger Series. Medals were awarded in the disciplines of men's singles, women's singles, and ice dance.

Entries 
The International Skating Union published the list of entries on October 18, 2021.

Changes to preliminary assignments

Results

Men

Women

Ice dance

References

External links 
 Cup of Austria at the International Skating Union
 
 Results

Ice Challenge
Cup of Austria
Cup of Austria
CS Cup of Austria